Ajay is a 2006 Indian Kannada-language action film starring Puneeth Rajkumar, Anuradha Mehta and Prakash Raj. It was Anuradha's debut Kannada film. The film is a remake of the Telugu film Okkadu (2003).

Plot
Ajay is a Bangalore-based Kabbadi player, the son of DCP Kumaraswamy, visits Hubli to take part in a state-level tournament. In Hubli, Ajay saves Padma from Vijay Reddy, a dangerous faction leader, who wants to marry her against her wishes. Ajay learns that Padma is trying to leave for the US for pursuing higher education after Vijay killed her brothers, when they refuse to marry their sister to Vijay due to age gap. In the process of saving Padma, Ajay humiliates Vijay by pushing him into a mud pond.

Vijay refuses to cleanse the mud until Padma is brought back. Ajay helps Padma escape and takes her to his house, hiding her in his room with the help of his sister Asha. However, Ajay's parents find out she is hiding in their house. Padma and Ajay run away again and the duo, along with Ajay's friends, reaches the airport to help Padma relocate to US. They bring her parents to see her one last time before she leaves. After Padma passed the airport security, Ajay realises he loves Padma. She shows up and proposes to him. At the airport, Kumaraswamy arrests Ajay while Vijay's men take Padma away. After Padma taunts Vijay by saying that Ajay will definitely come for her, Vijay goes to the prison and asks Ajay to come with him. Vijay and his henchmen are kidnapped by Ajay, who, along with his friends, attend the finals of the national-level Kabaddi tournament.

Meanwhile, Vijay's brother Siva Reddy, who happens to be the state's Home Minister, is waiting at the venue of Vijay's marriage with Padma. After learning about his whereabouts, Siva reaches the stadium along with Padma and his mother where Ajay and Vijay are fighting with each other. Swapna's father stabs Vijay while his mother dies in a bomb blast. Siva decides not to react as it would harm his position and Ajay, whose team won the match, celebrates the victory with Padma and his family.

Cast

 Puneeth Rajkumar as Ajay
 Anuradha Mehta as Padma alias Paddu
 Prakash Raj as Vijay Reddy, a dangerous faction leader
 Srinath as Padma's father
 Doddanna as Home Minister Shiva Reddy, Vijay Reddy's brother 
 Nassar as DCP Kumaraswamy, Ajay's father
 Sumithra as Ajay's mother 
 Sathyajith
 Vijaya Sarathi 
 Tennis Krishna
 Raghu Ram 
 Kuri Sunil 
 Mahesh Raj 
 Venkatesh Prasad 
 Swami nathan 
 Jaidev 
 K. V. Manjayya 
 Vishwas Bharadwaj 
 Indhudhar Poojari 
 Telangana Shakuntala as Vijay's mother 
 Shailaja Joshi 
 Amrutha Yadav 
 Sarigama Viji as Home Minister PA
 Jr. Narasimharaju

Soundtrack
Soundtrack was composed by Mani Sharma. The song "Yene Aagali" was based on "Chitti Nadumune" from Gudumba Shankar. Only the songs "Saagasam" and "Rama Rama" from Okkadu was retained in this version.

Reception
A critic from Sify wrote that the film had the "tried and tested formula which is also entertaining with good production values" and called the film "A treat for Puneeth fans". A critic from Rediff.com wrote that "Aajay is enjoyable fare for large sections of the Kannada film audience who have not seen Okkudu,  but it can be a little disappointing for those who have seen the original and its Tamil remake, Gilli".

References

External links 
 

2006 films
2000s Kannada-language films
Kannada remakes of Telugu films
Films scored by Mani Sharma
Indian sports films
Indian action films
Rockline Entertainments films
Films directed by Meher Ramesh
2006 action films
2000s sports films
Kabaddi in India